William Durkee Williamson (July 31, 1779 – May 27, 1846) was the second Governor of the U.S. state of Maine, and one of the first congressmen from Maine in the United States House of Representatives. He was a member of the Democratic-Republican Party.  Williamson was also an early historian of Maine. Williamson’s legacy was to exonerate white society for its role in Native dispossession and to justify it by white supremacy.

Early life
Williamson was born on July 31, 1779, in Canterbury, Connecticut, and was named after his father's maternal grandfather and eldest brother, William Durkee.  He was the oldest son born to George Williamson, who served in the Army during the Revolutionary War, and Mary (née Foster) Williamson.  His younger brother, Joseph Williamson, later served as Senate President.

He completed his preparatory course at Deerfield Academy and graduated from Williams College and Brown University.

Career
Williamson moved to Bangor, then part of Massachusetts, in the first decade of the 19th century and established a law practice there in 1807. He became Bangor's postmaster (among other offices) in 1810.  During the War of 1812 he was present at the capture and sacking of Bangor by the British following the Battle of Hampden and, like all male residents of the town, was made to sign an oath declaring he would not take up arms for the remainder of the war.

Elected office
Following the war, in 1816, Williamson was elected to the Massachusetts State Senate representing the District of Maine, but became a force behind the movement for Maine statehood.

In 1820, Maine separated from Massachusetts to become a state, and Williamson became the third President of the Maine State Senate. In 1821, when the first governor, William King resigned, Williamson automatically succeeded him as he was president of the Senate. Williamson served as governor from May 29, 1821, to December 5, 1821.

That same year he ran for and won a congressional seat in the seventeenth Congress.  Williamson resigned as governor to serve in the U.S. House of Representatives, serving until 1823.

Later career
Williamson returned to his law practice in Bangor, also serving as Judge of Probate for Penobscot County until 1840.

Williamson was one of Maine's first historians, writing a 2-volume History of the State of Maine in the late 1830s. This stood as the standard reference on early Maine history for the rest of the 19th century.  He was an original member of the Maine Historical Society.

Personal life
Williamson was married to Jemima Montague at Amherst, Massachusetts, on June 10, 1806.  She was the youngest daughter of Josiah and Submit Rice, who had been adopted into the family of her uncle, Gen. Zebina Montague.  Before her death in Bangor, Maine, on June 22, 1822, at the age of 36, they were the parents of five children together:

 Caroline J. Williamson, who married Nathaniel Haynes, a lawyer. After his death, she married John Chapman of Boston.
 Harriet H. Williamson (d. 1884), who married Paul R. Hazeltine, a merchant from Belfast, Maine.
 William F. Williamson (d. 1832), who died, aged 18, during his junior year at Bowdoin College.
 Mary C. Williamson, who married Richard W. Shapleigh. After his death, she married Livingston Livingston, a lawyer from New York.
 Frances A. Williamson (d. 1847), who married Mayo Hazeltine of Boston.

On June 3, 1823, he remarried to Susan E. White, the daughter of Judge Phineas White of Putney, Vermont.  She died, less than a year after their marriage, on March 9, 1824.  Williamson married for the third time in 1825 to Clarissa (née Emerson) Wiggin, the widow of Joseph Wiggin and daughter of Edward and Abigail Emerson of York, Maine.

Williamson died in 1846 in Bangor and was buried at Mount Hope Cemetery.

Descendants
Through his youngest daughter Frances, he was the grandfather of Frances Clarissa Hazeltine, who married Edward Livingston, a prominent businessman and clubman.  He was also the grandfather of Professor Henry W. Haynes of Boston, Mayo W. Hazeltine and Philip Livingston, a graduate of Columbia College.

Published works
 The History of the State of Maine: From Its First Discovery, A.D. 1602, to the Separation, A.D. 1820, Inclusive, Volume 1, by William Durkee Williamson.
 The History of the State of Maine: From Its First Discovery, 1602, to the Separation, A.D. 1820, Inclusive, Volume 2, by William Durkee Williamson.

References

External links
 
 
 Representative Men of Maine
 National Governors Association

1779 births
1846 deaths
Governors of Maine
Brown University alumni
Politicians from Bangor, Maine
Massachusetts state senators
Members of the United States House of Representatives from Maine
American Congregationalists
Williams College alumni
Historians of Maine
Maine Democratic-Republicans
Presidents of the Maine Senate
Burials at Mount Hope Cemetery (Bangor, Maine)
Democratic-Republican Party members of the United States House of Representatives
Democratic-Republican Party state governors of the United States